The 2008 Swale Borough Council election took place on 1 May 2008 to elect members of Swale Borough Council in Kent, England. One third of the council was up for election and the Conservative Party stayed in overall control of the council.

After the election, the composition of the council was:
Conservative 26
Labour 9
Independent 7
Liberal Democrats 5

Background
16 of the 47 seats on the council were contested in 2008, with the Conservatives defending 9 seats, the Liberal Democrats 4 seats and Labour 3 seats. A total of 53 people contested the election and as well as candidates from the main political parties,  there were also 2 candidates from Sheppey First standing on the Isle of Sheppey and 2 candidates from Faversham First contesting wards in Faversham.

Election result
The Conservative majority on the council was increased by one seat after gaining three seats, but also losing two seats. Both Labour and the Liberal Democrats had a net loss of one seat, while Sheppey First gained a seat.

The Conservatives picked up two seats from the Liberal Democrats in Minster Cliffs and St Michaels and one seat from Labour in Queenborough and Halfway. However the Liberal Democrats took one seat from the Conservatives in Davington Priory, while Sheppey First also gained a seat from the Conservatives in Sheppey Central.

Ward results

By-elections between 2008 and 2010

Minster Cliffs
A by-election was held in Minster Cliffs on 25 September 2008 after the resignation of Sheppey First councillor Chris Boden. The seat was gained for the Conservatives by Andy Booth with a majority of 221 votes over Sheppey First candidate Ray Adams.

Sheerness East
A by-election was held in Sheerness East on 25 September 2008 after the resignation of Sheppey First councillor Gemma Wray. The seat was gained by Labour candidate David Sargent with a majority of 149 votes over Liberal Democrat Colin Howe.

Teynham and Lynsted
A by-election was held in Teynham and Lynsted on 2 October 2008 after the death of Conservative councillor John Disney. The seat was held by Conservative Trevor Fentiman with a majority of 274 votes over Labour candidate Ken Rowles.

References

2008
2008 English local elections
2000s in Kent